FX-55 may refer to:

 A type of AMD Athlon 64 microprocessor 
 An 'eco-friendly' monochrome photographic developer